SAMIS-ESIC School of Information and Communication (Sekoly Ambony momba ny Ita sy ny Serasera – École Supérieure de l'Information et de la Communication) was founded in 2001 by the Jesuits on the campus of St. Michael College, Amparibem, Madagascar, devoted entirely to training professional journalists and effective communicators for diverse careers. Sami-ESIC offers both bachelor's and master's degrees. A typical graduation will include about 100 students.

Mission
SAMIS-ESIC prepares professionals with communications skills, including written press, radio, television, and political communication, as well as expertise in information and communication technologies. This area of education was chosen by the Jesuits because of its potential for fostering the democratic process and because of the increasing importance of the web: blogs, chat, multimedia art, social networks, immersive technologies, virtual organizations, portable media, podcasts. Integrated into studies are practicums and internships.

Program
Students spend the first two years on a core curriculum, and in the third year choose one of the following areas:
 Media communication (journalism)
 Organizational communication (public relations)
 Social communication

Facilities
 Computer room
 Radio studio
 TV studio

See also
 List of Jesuit sites

References  

Universities and colleges in Madagascar
Jesuit universities and colleges
Educational institutions established in 2001
2001 establishments in Madagascar